Buzz Lightyear of Star Command: The Adventure Begins (originally advertised as Buzz Lightyear of Star Command: The Movie and also known as Buzz Lightyear of Star Command) is a 2000 American animated science fiction action-adventure comedy direct-to-video film. It serves as a spin-off of the Toy Story franchise and was released on August 8, 2000. The film later led to a television series, Buzz Lightyear of Star Command, which aired on UPN and ABC from October 2000 to January 2001, and a CGI-animated feature film, Lightyear, which was theatrically released in the United States in June 2022, serving as an origin story for the character, voiced by Chris Evans. The film was nominated for two Video Premiere Awards: Best Animated Video Premiere and Best Animated Character Performance for Allen.

Plot
A framing device shows Andy's bedroom (after the events of Toy Story 2) where all of his toys are about to watch the VHS copy of Buzz Lightyear of Star Command.

In the film, Buzz Lightyear and his partner Warp Darkmatter are searching for three missing Little Green Men (L.G.M.), a noosphere-dwelling race working as scientists for Star Command's Universe Protection Unit. They discover the lost L.G.M. in a hidden lab belonging to an organization led by the evil Emperor Zurg. Buzz and Warp break in and rescue the L.G.M., keeping Zurg's robots busy while they escape. However, Zurg triggers the self-destruct mechanism; Warp gets pinned under debris and forces Buzz to leave just before the explosion happens, apparently killing Warp. Stricken with survivor guilt over Warp's death, Buzz refuses to have another partner, fearing that Zurg would kill them as well. 

He then meets up with Commander Nebula, who introduces him to Mira Nova, a prodigy ranger and the princess of the planet Tangea, which Buzz saved from Zurg a while back, and offers her to Buzz as his new partner. With the power of "ghosting", Nova is nearly invincible, but Buzz is still reluctant. Afterwards Buzz later prevents a well-meaning janitor named Booster, who dreams of becoming a space ranger himself one day, from being fired. Meanwhile, in Zurg's fortress, a new henchman called Agent Z arrives with a multi-weapon robotic arm. Zurg learns of a huge orb on the L.G.M. homeworld called the Uni-Mind, responsible for the telepathic link between them; he sends his new agent to capture it. The L.G.M.s on Star Command build a new robot soldier called XR, who is offered to Buzz as a partner as he can be repaired after any damage. They then get a telepathic message about Zurg's attack on their homeworld. When Buzz and XR arrive on the L.G.M. planet, Agent Z confronts them and destroys XR while Zurg steals the Uni-Mind. Unable to think clearly, the L.G.M. rebuild XR, but end up giving him a mind of his own. Commander Nebula decides to launch a full-scale assault on Planet Z, despite Mira's argument that a solo ranger could go to stop Zurg with the prototype Alpha-One.

Zurg corrupts the Uni-Mind with his own evil thoughts and installs it into the "Mega-Ray" to bend everyone to Zurg's will. Mira steals the Alpha-One prototype spacecraft to fight Zurg, and Buzz, who wanted to follow her plan, pursues Mira in his own craft, unaware Booster and XR have stowawayed. Eventually, Buzz catches Mira and stores Alpha-One in his spaceship's cargo bay; Booster and XR are then discovered. Zurg's Mega-Ray subverts several planets in quick succession before turning it on Star Command. Buzz, Mira, Booster, and XR discover all of the staff, including Nebula, have been suborned by Zurg; they flee in Buzz's Star Cruiser. Zurg uses Star Command's entire arsenal, planting a bomb on Buzz's ship. Buzz and the others escape in the Alpha-One just before the bomb detonates, destroying the cruiser. Zurg presumes Buzz dead.

Booster accidentally causes the ship to crash-land on Planet Z. There, Buzz, insistent on finishing the mission alone, orders the others to leave. Buzz fights Agent Z, but is incapacitated and delivered to Zurg when Agent Z reveals himself to be Warp, who, in addition to having faked his death, was secretly working for Zurg for years as a double agent. Buzz dictates his "final log entry", a coded distress call to Mira, Booster and XR.

Zurg plans to use the Mega-Ray on Buzz, but XR and Booster intervene in time to rescue him as it fires. Booster and Mira destroy Warp's mechanical arm after Booster lands on him. Buzz fights Zurg, who escapes before Buzz's allies can arrest him. Booster and XR arrest Warp and skydive from Zurg's exploding tower. Mira uses her "ghosting" power to push Buzz to the core of the Uni-Mind and restore it to normal, freeing the suborned peoples and leaving Zurg momentarily helpless and dismayed. The unity of the L.G.M. is restored and Warp is taken to prison for treason.

Buzz, having finally admitted that he cannot work alone, creates a new team called "Team Lightyear" with XR, Mira and Booster.

Voice cast

Production
Set in the fictional universe of the Disney/Pixar film series Toy Story, the film inspired a line of Buzz Lightyear toys. The opening computer-animated sequence was directed by Angus MacLane at Pixar, while the main parts of the film are traditionally animated by Walt Disney Television Animation. It was the only production that was a spin-off of a Pixar film until 2013's theatrical Cars spin-off film Planes produced by Disneytoon Studios. The movie was written and produced by Bob Schooley and Mark McCorkle, who would later go on to create Kim Possible for Disney Channel.

Originally announced and advertised as Buzz Lightyear of Star Command: The Movie, the series had not yet premiered, so the title was later changed to The Adventure Begins. This marks the one time that Pixar had involvement with a straight to video movie.

Tim Allen, Wallace Shawn, R. Lee Ermey, and Joe Ranft reprised their roles from the films. Woody is voiced by Jim Hanks, the brother of his original actor Tom Hanks, and Hamm is voiced by Andrew Stanton replacing his original actor John Ratzenberger.

Originally, Patrick Warburton voiced Buzz for the film, but when it was released to video, he was replaced by Allen. When the movie was later aired as the first three episodes of the television show Buzz Lightyear of Star Command, the opening sequence in Andy's bedroom was removed, and Warburton's vocal performance replaced Allen's.

During the film's end credits, the song, "To Infinity and Beyond", was arranged by Randy Petersen and Tim Heintz and performed by William Shatner and the Star Command Chorus.

Reception 
Bruce Fretts of Entertainment Weekly rated the film D+ and called it "a straight-to-tape travesty".  Susan King of the Los Angeles Times described the animation as "a cut above the norm" for direct-to-video films, and she said the script is "breezy and funny".

Awards and nominations

Notes

See also
Buzz Lightyear of Star Command
 Lightyear

References

External links

 
 

2000 films
2000 animated films
2000 computer-animated films
2000 direct-to-video films
2000 science fiction films
2000s American animated films
2000s English-language films
2000s science fiction comedy films
American children's animated space adventure films
American children's animated comic science fiction films
American children's animated science fantasy films
American robot films
American science fiction comedy films
Animated films about extraterrestrial life
Animated films about robots
Buzz Lightyear
Buzz Lightyear of Star Command
Disney direct-to-video animated films
Disney Television Animation films
Film spin-offs
Films about artificial intelligence
Films directed by Tad Stones
Films set in outer space
Films set on fictional planets
Self-reflexive films
Toy Story